Mazo may refer to:

Places
Mazo Beach, Wisconsin, USA
Mazomanie, Wisconsin, referred to as Mazo & where the beach is located
Robledo del Mazo, Castile-La Mancha, Spain 
Villa de Mazo, La Palma, Spain

People
Mazo (surname)
Mazo de la Roche (1879–1961), Canadian writer

See also
Mazzo (disambiguation)